{{Album ratings
| rev1 =Allmusic
| rev1Score = 
| rev2 =Kerrang!
| rev2Score = 
| noprose = yes
|rev3      = Christgau's Record Guide
|rev3Score = B+ 
| rev4 = The Great Rock Discography
| rev4Score = 7/10<ref name="GRD"></ref>
|rev5 = The Penguin Guide to Blues Recordings|rev5score  = 
}}Soul to Soul is the third studio album by American blues rock band Stevie Ray Vaughan and Double Trouble released on September 30, 1985, by Epic Records. Recording sessions took place between March and May 1985 at the Dallas Sound Lab in Dallas, Texas. Vaughan wrote four of Soul to Soul'''s ten tracks; two songs were released as singles. The album went to #34 on the Billboard 200 chart and the music video for "Change It" received regular rotation on MTV. In 1999, a reissue of the album was released, which includes an audio interview segment and two studio outtakes.

Soul to Soul received mixed reviews, with acclaim for Vaughan’s style and playing, and criticism for a lack of inspiration and Vaughan’s “hit or miss songwriting.”

In 1999, a reissue of the album was released which contains an audio interview segment and studio outtakes.  In 2014, Analogue Productions Remaster used the original master tape for the first time since the first CD edition. The lyrics before the guitar solo on "Life Without You" have been restored audibly, whereas on other CD editions since 1999 they had been edited out.

Track listing

Original Release

1999 Reissue Bonus Tracks

"SRV Speaks" is from a studio interview with Timothy White for Westwood One Radio.  The remaining bonus tracks are studio outtakes from the sessions for the album.

Charts

Certifications

Personnel
Double Trouble
Stevie Ray Vaughan – guitar, vocals, drums on "Empty Arms"
Tommy Shannon – bass, vocals on "Say What!"
Chris Layton – drums, vocals on "Say What!"
Reese Wynans – keyboards, vocals on "Say What!"

Additional personnel
Joe Sublett – saxophone on "Lookin' Out the Window" and "Look at Little Sister"

Production
Producers – Stevie Ray Vaughan and Double Trouble, Richard Mullen
Executive producer – John H. Hammond
Engineer – Richard Mullen
Assistant engineer – Ron Cote
Cover art – Holland MacDonald

1999 reissue - with edited lyrics on "Life Without You"
Producer – Bob Irwin
Executive producer – Tony Martell
Mastering engineer – Vic Anesini
Tracks 11–13 mixed by Danny Kadar
Dialogue edited by Darcy Proper
Research assistants – Al Quaglieri, Matthew Kelly
Art director – Josh Cheuse
Editorial director – Andy Schwartz
Liner notes – Timothy White

References

1985 albums
Stevie Ray Vaughan albums
Epic Records albums
Legacy Recordings albums